The Crimea Memorial Church, also known as Christ Church, is a Church of England church in the Beyoglu - Taksim district of Istanbul, Turkey.

History
The current church was built on land donated by Sultan Abdulmecid and was constructed between 1858 and 1868 in memory of British soldiers who had died in the Crimean War.

The idea of building a memorial church in Istanbul was first raised in 1856 and a competition held.  Designs were submitted by the architect William Burges and he was declared the winner.  However, in-fighting on the approval committee, coupled with concerns regarding the supposed "un-English" style of Burges' design, led to his being removed as architect in 1863 and his replacement by George Edmund Street.  The church was then constructed in Victorian Gothic style between 1864 and 1868.

Lack of a congregation led to the closure of the church in 1978. Much of the work to restore the building was carried out by a group of Sri Lankan refugees who fled to Istanbul at the time of the Iraqi invasion of Kuwait. The church re-opened in September 1991.

The organ was made in England in 1911 by W. Hill & Son, who also built organs for York Minster, Ely, Worcester, and Manchester cathedrals. The wrought iron staircase was also brought from London. The organ loft houses regimental flags from Crimean and Gallipoli campaigns and the flag from the battleship that took Mehmed VI, the last sultan, into exile. Its facade is decorated with colourful modern takes on Biblical stories by the artist, Erica Beard.

The wooden rood screen was erected in 1923 in memory of those who died at Gallipoli. Between 1995 and 2005 the Scottish artist Mungo McCosh adorned it with images of saints and others set against a backdrop of the İstanbul skyline. Figures associated with the congregation provided the models for the saints' faces. In another Turkish twist, the Christ child is shown holding a simit.

The chancel contains a memorial to Roger Short, the British Consul-General killed by a bomb that destroyed the original entrance to the British Consulate on 30 November 2003.

Work of the Church

Liturgy is read in the church every Sunday at 11 a.m., and attendance is open to all.

Since the church was reopened, the crypt has served as one of the main areas of the church's charitable work to help refugees and migrants who find themselves in Istanbul. The church has housed over 2000 homeless people in recent years and continues to provide assistance to displaced people, notably Christians who have fled Pakistan.

References

Anglican church buildings in Turkey
Churches in Istanbul
Crimean War
Beyoğlu
Churches completed in 1868
Protestantism in Turkey
Anglo-Catholic church buildings in Turkey
Diocese in Europe
19th-century Anglican church buildings
19th-century churches in Turkey